Christopher J. Brown is an American Republican Party politician who served in the New Jersey General Assembly from January 2012 to December 2015, representing the 8th Legislative District.

Life and career
Brown received a B.A. degree in political science from The College of New Jersey. He is the founder and chief executive officer of Castle Realty Management, which currently has more than 130 employees and independent contractors in several New Jersey offices, including Guardian Settlement Agents and Guardian Property and Casualty in Marlton.

Brown served as deputy mayor of Evesham Township from 2007 to 2008. In 2008, he was elected to the Burlington County Board of Chosen Freeholders as a Democrat, becoming one of the first Democrats to hold the position since 1983. In 2010, he switched parties and became a Republican. He announced he would not seek re-election for freeholder in 2011.

On August 11, 2011, after the resignation of Patrick Delany from the General Assembly seat in the 8th district, Burlington County Republicans selected former Mount Laurel Township mayor Gerry Nardello to serve the remainder of Delany's term and also selected Brown to be the Republican candidate in the 2011 general election. Brown and his running mate Scott Rudder defeated the Democratic candidates, Anita Lovely and Pamela Finnerty. He was sworn in on January 10, 2012. In the 2013 election, he won reelection alongside Republican Maria Rodriguez-Gregg. He announced his retirement from the Assembly prior to the 2015 elections, citing frustration for being in the minority party in the Legislature and his desire to spend more time with his family.

Personal life
Brown resides in Evesham Township. He has four sons.

References

External links
New Jersey Legislature financial disclosure forms
2012 2011

1971 births
American real estate businesspeople
Living people
County commissioners in New Jersey
Republican Party members of the New Jersey General Assembly
New Jersey Democrats
People from Evesham Township, New Jersey
Politicians from Burlington County, New Jersey
The College of New Jersey alumni
21st-century American politicians